The BOV, is an all-wheel drive armoured vehicle manufactured in the former Yugoslavia and today in Serbia. The second generation BOV is currently in development.

First generation

Description
The BOV has a capacity of 10, including a driver, gunner and eight infantrymen. The vehicle has a four-wheel drive and is powered by the Deutz type F 6L 413 F six-cylinder diesel engine developing 150 hp (110 kW) at 2650 rpm.

Service history
The BOV was used for internal security and military duties. It was most commonly used by territorial defence units, in several variants equipped with machine guns, water cannons, smoke and tear gas dispensers for crowd control and riots.

BOV has a long combat use on the territory of the former Yugoslavia. At the beginning of the first riots in Slovenia and Croatia military police units of the JNA often used BOVs that have mainly served to protect convoys of the JNA. Also many airplanes were shot down over Croatia by self-propelled guns PSC BOV-3. Many BOV armored vehicles were lost mainly due to their weak armor protection. BOVs have also been massively used during the Kosovo conflict by the Army of Yugoslavia and the MUP of Serbia. In combination with T-55 tanks, M-80 infantry fighting vehicles and supported by infantry, mainly the AA version BOV-3 was used to clear villages of members of the KLA . 

Today, the BOVs in the Serbian Army are used by the Military Police (BOV M-86), in army mechanized armor battalions (BOV M-83) and in a reserve artillery rocket battalion PVO (BOV-3). BOVs are also used by special forces of the MUP Serbia, Republika Srpska, Croatia and BiH Federation. The Slovenian and Croatian armies used the BOV during war in Afghanistan.

Variants
 BOV-1 - anti-tank vehicle armed with 6x AT-3 missiles. Also known as POLO (protivoklopno lansirno orudje) M-83.
 BOV-3 - air-defence version with triple M55A4B1 20mm cannon.
 BOV-30 - prototype air-defence vehicle with twin mounted 30mm guns.
 BOV-M - armoured personnel carrier for the Milicija. This version is armed with smoke-grenade launchers and a 7.62mm or 12.7mm machine gun.
 BOV-SN - ambulance version.
 BOV-VP - armoured personnel carrier for the military police. Also known as M-86.

New developed from first generation
 BOV M10 - armored vehicle for artillery systems command and control.
 BOV M11 - armored reconnaissance vehicle.
 BOV M15 - armoured personnel carrier for the military police based on BOV-VP with new engine, transmission, run-flat tires, remote-controlled weapon station with a 12.7 mm machine gun. and better armour protection.
 HS M09 BOV-3 - hybrid air-defense system based on BOV-3 with 8 x Strela 2 SAM's mounted on turret.
 MRČKB BOV-3 - mobile radio communication for battalion commander integrated in to BOV-3 vehicle.
 BOV KIV - Command and reconnaissance modernized armored vehicle. First batch of 10 introduced in 2020.

Second generation

Description
Second generation BOV is currently in development with serial production planned for second half of 2018. New generation BOV vehicle has a new four-wheel drive and is powered by the Cummins diesel engine. It has weight about 11 tons, new transmission, new communications devices and protects crew against 12.7mm caliber guns and all anti-armor land mines. New generation BOV has integrated  air-condition and independent battery power source that enables all functions working without engine turned on thus enabling silent operation. It has few variants planned including different commend variants, scout, armed, military police and as personnel carrier. Current known versions are armed with RCWS consisting of 7.62mm Zastava machine-gun and 40mm grenade launcher or 12.7mm Zastava manned turret. Scout versions have mast with high resolution day and night cameras, data link to transmit all information in real time to command center. Command versions have additional internal posts with displays for viewing tactical situation. It can carry up to six soldiers in scout and personal carrier variant.

Variants
 BOV scout vehicle - enhanced second generation variant scout version including new communications system with high and very high frequency radios, a heating and air-conditioning system, thermal cameras, fire detection and suppression system, auxiliary power unit, telescopic sensor mast, and upgraded armor. Armed with 12.7mm manned turret.
 BOV division artillery command vehicle enhanced second generation variant command version armed with RCWS consisting of 7.62mm machine-gun and 40mm grenade launcher. It has command posts inside with computer displays for tactical situation. Other equipment similar to scout.
 BOV battery artillery command vehicle enhanced second generation variant command version armed with RCWS consisting of 7.62mm machine-gun and 40mm grenade launcher. It has command posts inside with computer displays for tactical situation. Other equipment similar to scout.
 BOV infantry command vehicle enhanced second generation variant command version armed with RCWS consisting of 7.62mm machine-gun and 40mm grenade launcher. It has command posts inside with computer displays for tactical situation. Other equipment similar to scout.

Gallery - First generation

Operators

Current operators
  - Bangladesh Army operates 8+ BOV M11s.
  - 32 BOV-1s.
  - 33 BOV-3, 20 BOV-1 and 6 BOV-VP
  - 8 BOV-VP, 9 BOV-1
  - 51 BOV-VP, 48 BOV-1 with 9M14 Malyutka

Former operators
 
  - Passed on to successor states

See also
Lists of armoured fighting vehicles

References

Armoured fighting vehicles of Yugoslavia
BOV APC
Military equipment of Bosnia and Herzegovina
Military vehicles introduced in the 1980s
Armoured personnel carriers of the Cold War